Brad Peyton (born May 27, 1978) is a Canadian film director, writer, and producer, best known for directing the Dwayne Johnson star vehicles Journey 2: The Mysterious Island (2012), San Andreas (2015), and Rampage (2018) as well as the Netflix series Daybreak (2019).

Life and career
Peyton was born in Gander, Newfoundland and Labrador, Canada.  He graduated from the Canadian Film Centre. He first gained fame with a short film and gothic comedy entitled Evelyn: The Cutest Evil Dead Girl (2002).  The film was initially shown to Peyton's classmates, who clapped in approval.  Filmmaker Jeremy Podeswa thus suggested Peyton should also show the film to a lawyer in the film industry in New York. This allowed the film to be distributed among the filmmaking elite. Evelyn also appeared in the Toronto International Film Festival in 2002.

He then created and produced the surreal claymation television series What It's Like Being Alone, which was picked up by the Canadian Broadcasting Corporation in 2006. Reportedly, one of Peyton's mentors is US actor Tom Hanks.

Following the success of Alone, Peyton went on to direct Cats and Dogs: The Revenge of Kitty Galore in 2010. 
In 2012, he directed the successful sequel to Journey to the Center of the Earth, entitled Journey 2: The Mysterious Island,  which starred Dwayne Johnson and grossed $325.9 million. In 2015, Peyton directed the disaster film San Andreas, which also starred Johnson, and the horror film Incarnate.

Peyton directed the feature film adaptation Rampage (2018), starring Dwayne Johnson, marking their third collaboration. In June 2016 it was confirmed that he had signed on to direct the feature film adaptation of Malignant Man produced by James Wan. On February 10, 2017, it was reported that Peyton will direct, write and produce the upcoming disaster film, Black Hole, which will begin production in early 2018. In March 2017, it was reported that Peyton will be directing a film adaptation of the video game series Just Cause, with Jason Momoa set to star.

In July 2018, it was announced that Peyton was credited as an executive producer, writer, director and co-creator of the Netflix post-apocalyptic comedy series, Daybreak. The series premiered on October 24, 2019.

Filmography
Short films

Feature films

Television

References

External links

1978 births
Canadian television producers
Canadian surrealist artists
Canadian animators
Clay animators
Living people
People from Gander, Newfoundland and Labrador
Film directors from Newfoundland and Labrador